Félipe Leal (born 8 March 1982) is a Chilean rower. He competed in the men's single sculls event at the 2000 Summer Olympics.

References

External links
 

1982 births
Living people
Chilean male rowers
Olympic rowers of Chile
Rowers at the 2000 Summer Olympics
Sportspeople from Santiago
Pan American Games medalists in rowing
Pan American Games gold medalists for Chile
Pan American Games bronze medalists for Chile
Rowers at the 2003 Pan American Games
Rowers at the 2007 Pan American Games
Rowers at the 2011 Pan American Games
Rowers at the 2015 Pan American Games
Medalists at the 2007 Pan American Games
Medalists at the 2011 Pan American Games
Medalists at the 2015 Pan American Games
21st-century Chilean people